Helena Langšádlová (born 14 October 1963) is a Czech politician, who has served as the Czech Minister for Science and Research in Petr Fiala's Cabinet since December 2021. She has been a member of the Czech parliament since 2010, representing TOP 09.

References

1963 births
Living people
Politicians from Prague
TOP 09 MPs
TOP 09 Government ministers
TOP 09 politicians
Members of the Chamber of Deputies of the Czech Republic (2010–2013)
Members of the Chamber of Deputies of the Czech Republic (2013–2017)
Members of the Chamber of Deputies of the Czech Republic (2017–2021)
Members of the Chamber of Deputies of the Czech Republic (2021–2025)
Women government ministers of the Czech Republic
21st-century Czech women politicians
Women mayors of places in the Czech Republic
KDU-ČSL mayors